Jannatabad (also Romanized as Jannatābād) is a village in Eyvanki Rural District, Eyvanki District, Garmsar County, Semnan Province, Iran. At the 2006 census, its population was 297, in 69 families.

References 

Populated places in Garmsar County